Mauro Abel Richeze Araquistain (born 7 December 1985) is an Argentinian professional racing cyclist, who currently rides for UCI Continental team . His brothers Roberto, Maximiliano and Adrián are also cyclists.

Major results

2007
 1st  Points classification Tour de San Luis
 9th Coppa Colli Briantei Internazionale
 9th Coppa Città di Asti
2008
 1st Stage 9 Tour de Langkawi
 2nd Memorial Viviana Manservisi
2011
 1st Stage 6 Vuelta Ciclista al Uruguay
 4th GP Nobili Rubinetterie
2012
 1st Stage 1 Tour de Korea
 1st Stage 3 Tour de Kumano
2013
 Mzansi Tour
1st Stages 3 & 4
 1st Stage 2 Flèche du Sud
 Tour de Serbie
1st Stages 2 & 5
2015
 Vuelta a Costa Rica
1st Stages 6 & 7
 4th Road race, Pan American Games
2016
 1st  Road race, National Road Championships
 1st Stage 8 Vuelta Independencia Nacional
2017
 Vuelta Ciclista de Chile
1st  Points classification
1st Stages 2a & 3
 1st Stage 3a Vuelta Ciclista al Uruguay

References

External links

Living people
1985 births
Argentine male cyclists
Cyclists at the 2015 Pan American Games
Pan American Games competitors for Argentina
Sportspeople from Buenos Aires Province